Lake Wilson is a city in Murray County, Minnesota, United States. The population was 251 at the 2010 census.

Geography

Minnesota State Highways 30 and 91 are two of the main routes in the community.

Climate

Demographics

2010 census
As of the census of 2010, there were 251 people, 128 households, and 72 families living in the city. The racial makeup of the city was 99.6% White and 0.4% Asian. Hispanic or Latino of any race were 2.0% of the population.

There were 128 households, of which 15.6% had children under the age of 18 living with them, 52.3% were married couples living together, 3.1% had a female householder with no husband present, 0.8% had a male householder with no wife present, and 43.8% were non-families. 40.6% of all households were made up of individuals, and 15.6% had someone living alone who was 65 years of age or older. The average household size was 1.96 and the average family size was 2.61.

The median age in the city was 51.2 years. 16.7% of residents were under the age of 18; 4.9% were between the ages of 18 and 24; 19.2% were from 25 to 44; 35.2% were from 45 to 64; and 24.3% were 65 years of age or older. The gender makeup of the city was 52.6% male and 47.4% female.

2000 census
As of the census of 2000, there were 270 people, 128 households, and 83 families living in the city. The racial makeup of the city was 98.89% White, 0.37% from other races, and 0.74% from two or more races. Hispanic or Latino of any race were 4.07% of the population.

There were 128 households, out of which 26.6% had children under the age of 18 living with them, 53.1% were married couples living together, 7.8% had a female householder with no husband present, and 34.4% were non-families. 32.8% of all households were made up of individuals, and 19.5% had someone living alone who was 65 years of age or older.  The average household size was 2.11 and the average family size was 2.60.

In the city, the population was spread out, with 20.7% under the age of 18, 6.3% from 18 to 24, 24.8% from 25 to 44, 23.3% from 45 to 64, and 24.8% who were 65 years of age or older.  The median age was 44 years. For every 100 females, there were 101.5 males.  For every 100 females age 18 and over, there were 94.5 males.

The median income for a household in the city was $28,375, and the median income for a family was $30,000. Males had a median income of $32,813 versus $18,594 for females. The per capita income for the city was $16,573.  About 13.3% of families and 16.3% of the population were below the poverty line, including 24.6% of those under the age of eighteen and 12.3% of those 65 or over.

History
Lake Wilson was platted in 1883 and incorporated as a village on July 12, 1900. It was named by J. E. Wilson (a landowner in the area) who also named the nearby lake for himself.

On June 16, 1992, Lake Wilson was struck by a devastating F5 tornado that completely destroyed half of the town, which has since been rebuilt.

On January 12, 2004, the city's firehall exploded, destroying it and the nearby elevator. It also damaged many nearby houses and businesses. The blast was audible at 25 miles, and could be felt as far as 30 miles away. The city estimated that recovery costs resulting from the explosion totaled about $4.2 million.  Since then both the firehall and elevator have been rebuilt.

Politics
Lake Wilson is located in Minnesota's 1st congressional district, represented by Mankato educator Tim Walz, a Democrat. At the state level, Lake Wilson is located in Senate District 22, represented by Republican Doug Magnus, and in House District 22A, represented by Republican Joe Schomacker.

References

Cities in Minnesota
Cities in Murray County, Minnesota